The FIA Motorsport Games Drifting Cup was be the first FIA Motorsport Games Drifting Cup, to be held at ACI Vallelunga Circuit, Italy on 1 November to 2 November 2019.  The event was the part of the 2019 FIA Motorsport Games.

Each competitor had two solo runs, with the higher-scoring run counting towards a final qualifying classification. Top-16 drivers were eligible to contest the Final Battle stage. Drivers were seeded according to their qualifying results, with the best-scoring qualifier going up against the 16th-placed competitor, second facing 15th, etc. In qualifying, judges scored competitors using four criteria – line, angle, style and speed – up to a maximum total of 100 points. In the Final Battle phase, each judge scored the round individually with a majority decision between a three-person panel determining the winner.

Entry list

Results

Qualification

Battle Tournament (Final)

References

External links

Drifting Cup
Drifting (motorsport)